Nuestra Señora is Spanish for Mary, mother of Jesus.

Nuestra Señora may also refer to:

Costa Rica
Iglesia de la Nuestra Señora de las Mercedes, a church in Grecia, Costa Rica

Puerto Rico
Nuestra Señora de Lourdes Chapel in Santurce, Puerto Rico

Mexico
Iglesia de Nuestra Señora de los Remedios (Mexico) in Cholula, Puebla, Mexico
Nuestra Señora de Loreto Church in Mexico City, Mexico

Philippines
Nuestra Señora de los Desamparados Church in Manila, Philippines

Spain
Iglesia de Nuestra Señora de la Palma in Algeciras, Spain
Capilla de Nuestra Señora de Europa in Algeciras, Spain
Nuestra Señora de la Candelaria in Candelaria, Tenerife, Spain
Church of Nuestra Señora del Manzano in Castrojeriz, Burgos, Spain
Church of Nuestra Señora de las Nieves (Cenizate) in Cenizate, Spain
Nuestra Señora de la Soterraña in Santa María la Real de Nieva, Segovia, Spain
Nuestra Señora de Gracia Parish Church in Palomas, Badajoz, Extremadura, Spain
Church of Nuestra Señora de la Peña de Faido in Peñacerrada, Spain
Church of Nuestra Señora de la Esperanza in Peñas de San Pedro, Spain
Catedral de Nuestra Señora de la Huerta de Tarazona in Tarazona, Zaragoza, Spain
Nuestra Señora de Montserrat in Madrid, Spain

United States
La Iglesia de Nuestra Señora la Reina de los Ángeles in Los Angeles, California, United States
Nuestra Señora Reina de los Ángeles Asistencia in Los Angeles, California, United States

Uruguay
Cristo Obrero y Nuestra Señora de Lourdes in Estación Atlántida, Uruguay
Nuestra Señora del Carmen, Aguada, Montevideo in Montevideo, Uruguay
Nuestra Señora de los Dolores (Tierra Santa), Montevideo in Montevideo, Uruguay
Nuestra Señora de Lourdes y San Vicente Pallotti, Montevideo in Montevideo, Uruguay

See also
Church of Our Lady (disambiguation)